Angelika Neuwirth  (born 1943) is a German Islamic studies scholar and professor of Quranic studies at Freie University in Berlin.

Quranic education
Born in Nienburg, Lower Saxony, she studied Islamic studies, semitic studies and classical philology at the Universities of Berlin, Tehran, Göttingen, Jerusalem, and Munich.

Posts held
Neuwirth is also the director of the research project Corpus Coranicum. Between 1994 and 1999, she was the director of the German Institute of Oriental Studies in Beirut and Istanbul. She currently works as a professor in Freie University in Berlin and as a visiting professor at the University of Jordan in Amman, and her research focuses on the Qur'an, its interpretations, and modern Arabic literature in the Eastern Mediterranean, especially Palestinian poetry and prose related to the Arab-Israeli conflict.

Awards
In 2011 she was named an honorary member of the American Academy of Arts and Sciences, and in 2012 was granted an honorary doctorate from Yale University's Department of Religious Studies. In June 2013, the Deutsche Akademie für Sprache und Dichtung awarded her its Sigmund Freud Prize for her research on the Qur'an. In July 2018 she was elected as a Fellow of the British Academy.

Publications

 English translation:  

 (The Qur'ān: A Hand-Commentary with German Translation.) Five volumes planned:
 (Volume 1: Early Meccan Suras. Poetic Prophecy)
 (Volume 2/1: Early Middle Meccan Suras. The New People of God.)

References

German orientalists
Living people
German Islamic studies scholars
History of Quran scholars
1943 births
Women scholars of Islam
Women orientalists